Treaty at the Forks of the Wabash may refer to:
Treaty at the Forks of the Wabash (1834)
Treaty at the Forks of the Wabash (1838), part of the Indian removals in Indiana
Treaty of the Wabash, 1840

See also
Treaty of Mississinewas, also called Treaty of the Wabash, 1826